Alaa Abdulkareem Fartusi (August 4, 1978 – February 10, 2008) was an Iraqi journalist for al-Furat, a Shiite-backed satellite news station.

Career
Fartusi worked as a camera man for al-Furat for two years prior to his death in 2008.

Fellow al-Furat reporter Ahmed Mehdi said of him:

Death

Fartusi was part of a crew traveling to Samarra for a story commemorating the 2nd anniversary of the February 2006 bombing of the Golden Mosque, one of the holiest Shiite sites in Iraq. On February 10, 2008, while travelling to Samarra, a roadside bomb was detonated, killing Fartusi and the driver of the vehicle he was travelling in. According to Mehdi, Fartusi and his team were probably not targeting the station. The first journalist killed in Iraq in 2008, Fartusi leaves behind his wife and two children, daughters ages 1 and 3.

References

2008 deaths
Iraqi journalists
Journalists killed while covering the Iraq War
20th-century journalists
1978 births